Jeffery Wade Ulbrich (born February 17, 1977) is an American football coach and former linebacker who is the defensive coordinator for the New York Jets of the National Football League (NFL). He played college football at Hawaii and was drafted by the San Francisco 49ers in the 3rd round (86th overall) in the 2000 NFL Draft and played for the 49ers from 2000 to 2009.

After retiring as a player following the 2009 season, Ulbrich was the assistant special teams coach for the Seattle Seahawks for two seasons. He then served as the linebackers and special teams coach at UCLA for three seasons and then served as an assistant coach for the Atlanta Falcons for six seasons.

Early years
Ulbrich attended Live Oak High School in Morgan Hill, California, and lettered three times in football and twice in wrestling. In football, he was a First-team All-League and team MVP. In wrestling, he won a league title (192 pounds).

Playing career

College
Ulbrich redshirted in his lone season at San Jose State before transferring to Gavilan College. He earned first-team All-Conference and team MVP in lone season at Gavilan College in Gilroy, California. He was a two-year starter at Hawaii. He earned All-WAC first-team selection and team co-captain as a senior. He started all 12 games at middle linebacker. He led the conference with a school-record 169 tackles (42 solo) his senior year. Ulbrich set a school record with 127 assisted tackles, breaking the old mark of 97. He ranked third in the league with eight sacks for 67 yards. He had 15 tackles for loss (58 yards). He was credited with eight quarterback pressures, two fumble recoveries and one forced fumble. He returned two interceptions for 38 yards and had one pass defensed. He played in seven games, starting three at strong side inside linebacker as a junior. He finished with 41 tackles (28 solo), including a nine-yard sack. He caused and recovered a fumble.

National Football League

San Francisco 49ers
Ulbrich was drafted out of the University of Hawaiʻi at Mānoa by the San Francisco 49ers in the third round (86th pick overall) of the 2000 NFL Draft. He only saw action in four games during his rookie season due to a right shoulder injury. He won the starting job in 2001. In 2005, he started only five games at inside linebacker before missing the remainder of the season with a torn biceps muscle. He started in 9 out of 16 games in 2006. Ulbrich took a backup role to first round pick Patrick Willis, and also a role on special teams. He was placed on injured reserve on October 19, 2009, after he suffered a concussion. Ulbrich announced his plans to retire as a result of the concussion on December 9. Upon retirement, he said that he would like to become a college football coach one day.

Coaching career

Seattle Seahawks
On January 29, 2010, Ulbrich was hired by the Seattle Seahawks as a special teams assistant.

UCLA
In 2012, Ulbrich became the UCLA Bruins linebackers and special teams coach. Ulbrich was elevated to Assistant Head Coach in the spring of 2012, in addition to his duties with the linebackers and special teams. In February of 2014, he was promoted to Defensive Coordinator. Two of his linebacker group, Anthony Barr and Jordan Zumwalt, were selected in the 2014 NFL Draft. Ulbrich's defensive unit was ranked third in the Pac-12 in total defense for 2014. It was led by the Butkus and Lott IMPACT Trophy winner linebacker Eric Kendricks. One of his players, Anthony Barr led the nation in sacks with 13.5.

Atlanta Falcons
In 2015, Ulbrich was hired by the Atlanta Falcons as a linebackers coach.

In the 2016 season, Ulbrich and the Falcons reached Super Bowl LI, where they faced the  New England Patriots. In the Super Bowl, the Falcons fell in a 34–28 overtime defeat.

In 2020, Ulbrich was promoted to assistant head coach and linebackers coach.

On October 12, 2020, Ulbrich was named defensive coordinator under interim head coach Raheem Morris, as part of a midseason shakeup of the coaching staff.

New York Jets
On January 21, 2021, Ulbrich was hired by the New York Jets as their defensive coordinator under head coach Robert Saleh.

References

External links
New York Jets bio
Hawaii bio

1977 births
Living people
American football middle linebackers
Atlanta Falcons coaches
Gavilan Rams football players
Hawaii Rainbow Warriors football players
San Francisco 49ers players
Seattle Seahawks coaches
UCLA Bruins football coaches
People from Morgan Hill, California
Players of American football from San Jose, California
San Jose State University alumni
National Football League defensive coordinators 
New York Jets coaches